Margaret of Opava   (Czech: Markéta Opavská, Silesian: Margaret s Uopawje, German: Margaret von Troppau, Polish: Małgorzata opawska; 1330–1363) was the youngest daughter of Nicholas II of Opava, (grandson of Přemysl II, Otakar, King of Bohemia) and his third wife Anna of Racibórz. She became Margravine consort of Moravia by her marriage to John Henry of Moravia (1353).

Margaret was buried in Saint Thomas, Brno.

Children 
The couple had six children:
 Catherine of Moravia (March 1353 – 1378), consort of Henry, Duke of Falkenberg
 Jobst of Moravia (1351 – 18 January 1411), King of the Romans 
 Elizabeth of Moravia/Elizabeth of Meissen (1355 – 20 November 1400). Married William I, Margrave of Meissen.
 Anne, married Peter of Sterberg.
 John Sobieslaw of Moravia (October 1357 – 12 October 1394), (titular, not ruling) Margrave of Moravia
 Prokop of Moravia (November 1358 – September 1305), (titular, not ruling) Margrave of Moravia

See also
 Špilberk Castle
 Veveří Castle

References 

1330s births
1363 deaths
Opavian Přemyslids
House of Luxembourg
14th-century German women
Burials at the Church of St. Thomas (Brno)